Definition is a Canadian television game show, which aired on CTV from September 9, 1974 to March 10, 1989, and filmed at its flagship studios of CFTO-TV at 9 Channel Nine Court in Scarborough, Toronto, Ontario. For most of its run, it was hosted by Jim Perry.

History
Nick Nicholson and E. Roger Muir, the creators of The Newlywed Game, created Definition, resulting in the show being syndicated for some international audiences as well. The series was produced by Glen-Warren Productions for CTV.

Dave Michaels hosted the pilot for Definition. Michaels had previously announced the Nicholson-Muir game show Matches 'n Mates with Art James and later anchored news for KABC-TV, WXIA-TV, and CNN during the first Gulf War.  For its first season, the show was hosted by Bob McLean, with Jim Perry as announcer. Beginning the next season, and continuing until the series concluded, Perry moved in front of the camera to take over as emcee, with veteran Toronto weatherman Dave Devall filling the vacancy in the announcer's booth. Devall also served as Perry's stand-in whenever he was absent.

Definition was the longest-running daytime game show in Canadian television and the third longest-running daytime game show in North American television, behind Concentration and The Price Is Right. It made host Perry a household name during the 1970s and 1980s. Only about 850 of its 1,950 episodes still exist, however, due to a then-common practice known as wiping.  All remaining episodes currently stream on the retro Canadian game show streaming service BonusRound.ca.  

Beginning in the 1980s Definition encouraged viewers to send in their own puzzles via mail, with at least one chosen per episode. Viewers would have their definitions acknowledged on air by Perry if they were chosen.

Rules
Definitions format was loosely based on the word game Hangman. Two teams of two competed, originally a contestant and celebrity and from 1986 on two pairs of regular contestants. The teams would take turns guessing letters in a phrase for which Perry had offered a pun as a clue. The game is similar to Wheel of Fortune, which debuted around the same time.

The challengers began the game with one teammate "giving away" a letter to their opponents that they believed was not in the puzzle. If they were correct, the other teammate "took" a letter that they believed was in the puzzle. If this guess was also correct, all instances of the letter were revealed and the team could try to solve the puzzle.  If there were no letters available to give away, then each team would take turns to take a letter and attempt at a guess at solving the puzzle solution.

A team lost control if any of the following occurred:

 They failed to guess the puzzle.
 They took a letter that was not in the puzzle.
 They gave away a letter that was in the puzzle. In this case, the opponents could take a free guess before starting their turn.

The first team to solve two puzzles — changed to three in 1986 — won a prize and advanced to a bonus game. For this round, the champions faced one final definition in which the letters would be revealed one by one in alphabetical order. Solving the puzzle awarded $10 for every unrevealed letter, while failing to do so awarded $10 as a consolation prize (if time was called in the middle of a bonus round, the champions were automatically awarded whatever money was still up for grabs at that point). After every fifth consecutive win, the champions earned the right to play for a larger bonus prize, such as a refrigerator. When civilian/celebrity teams played, the civilian member of the champion team switched celebrity partners for the next game.

The show was frequently mocked, as were most Canadian game shows at the time, for the cheapness of its prizes, which were typically courtesy gifts such as small appliances. Only in its annual "Tournament of Champions" did the show typically offer major prizes such as new cars. A 2008 article in the National Post by Canadian television historian Peter Kenter claimed that most prizes were in fact overstock products from a retail warehouse; according to Kenter, who was a contestant on the show in 1987, he did not actually know what his prize would be until it was delivered to his home several weeks after taping, as even the producers had no knowledge of what the prizes would be during production, and the on-air prize announcement was actually a later overdub.

Theme music
The show's theme song was taken from "Soul Bossa Nova", an instrumental jazz piece by Quincy Jones. Later seasons of Definition used a new arrangement of the song which was not as readily recognizable.

The program's use of "Soul Bossa Nova" led both to the Canadian hip hop band Dream Warriors sampling the song for their 1991 hit "My Definition of a Boombastic Jazz Style", and to Mike Myers using the song as the theme music to the Austin Powers film series.

Adaptations
A British version of Definition aired on the ITV network from 1978 until about 1986, produced by HTV West and was originally hosted by Don Moss and then by the late Jeremy Beadle. Theme music was provided by guitarist Wout Steenhuis.  British audiences were also able to witness the Jim Perry-hosted version when it aired on UK cable station, Living TV (formerly UK Living) in the 1990s.  Don Moss also appeared as a celebrity guest player on Canada's original version.

References

External links
 

1974 Canadian television series debuts
1989 Canadian television series endings
CTV Television Network original programming
Television series by ITV Studios
Television series by Bell Media
Television series by Nicholson-Muir Productions
Television series by Glen-Warren Productions
Television shows filmed in Toronto
1970s Canadian game shows
1980s Canadian game shows
English-language television shows
Television shows produced by Harlech Television (HTV)
1978 British television series debuts
1986 British television series endings
1970s British game shows
1980s British game shows